David Marcus may refer to:
Mickey Marcus (David Daniel Marcus, 1901–1948), American-Israeli soldier
David Marcus (writer) (1924–2009), Irish Jewish editor and writer
David A. Marcus (born 1973), American entrepreneur, co-creator of Facebook's Diem
David Marcus (equestrian) (born 1980), Canadian Olympic dressage rider
David Marcus (Star Trek), a character in Star Trek

See also
 David Markus (born 1973), American government attorney